Neh Rural District is a rural district (dehestan) in the Central District of Nehbandan County, South Khorasan Province, Iran. At the 2006 census, its population was 11,478, in 2,769 families.  The rural district has 64 villages.

References 

Rural Districts of South Khorasan Province
Nehbandan County